Crossroads is an unincorporated community in Hardin County, Tennessee. Crossroads is located on Tennessee State Route 128, northeast of Savannah.

In fiction
Crossroads is featured extensively in the web comic Johnny Bullet. In the strip, it is spelled Cross Roads and is a larger size city, comparable to neighbouring Savannah, Tennessee, in Hardin County.

References

Unincorporated communities in Hardin County, Tennessee
Unincorporated communities in Tennessee